Erik Zeidlitz (alternate listings: Eric Zeidlitz, Erik Sigurd Zeidlitz, Eric Sigrud Zeidlitz, born December 11, 1945) is a Swedish sprint canoeist who competed from the 1966 to 1980. He won two medals at the ICF Canoe Sprint World Championships with a silver (C-2 1000 m: 1966) and a bronze (C-2 10000 m: 1970).

Zeidlitz also competed in four Summer Olympics, earning his best finish of fifth in the C-2 1000 m event at Mexico City in 1968.

References

Sports-reference.com profile

1945 births
Canoeists at the 1968 Summer Olympics
Canoeists at the 1972 Summer Olympics
Canoeists at the 1976 Summer Olympics
Canoeists at the 1980 Summer Olympics
Living people
Olympic canoeists of Sweden
Swedish male canoeists
ICF Canoe Sprint World Championships medalists in Canadian